Jeremy D. Finn is an American psychologist. He is currently a Distinguished Professor at the State University of New York, as well as a published author.

References

Year of birth missing (living people)
Living people
State University of New York faculty
21st-century American psychologists
University of Chicago alumni